Communist Renewal (Kommounistiki Ananeosi) is a communist organization in Greece. The group was formed in February 2000 following a split in late 1999 from the Renewing Communist Ecological Left (AKOA). The founders of Communist Renewal were dissatisfied with the upcoming cooperation between AKOA and Synaspismos. Communist Renewal then aligned with the Communist Party of Greece (KKE) in the 2000 elections. The alliance with KKE was then discontinued, but rekindled for the 2006 Greek local elections.

The organization publishes the magazine Stigma.

References

External links
(Greek) Official website
(Greek) Stigma magazine

2000 establishments in Greece
Communist parties in Greece
Political parties established in 2000